Sint-Lievens-Houtem (not officially recognized) is a Dutch-speaking municipality of Belgium. It is located in the Denderstreek and at the edge of the Flemish Ardennes, the hilly southern part of the province of East Flanders (Flemish Region). Sint-Lievens-Houtem is crossed by the Molenbeek in Vlierzele, Zonnegem and Letterhoutem.

It is named after Saint Livinus (Sint Lieven in Dutch), a Christian saint believed to have been buried there.

Houtem Jaarmarkt
In November every year, Sint-Lievens-Houtem holds a winter fair and livestock market, the Houtem Jaarmarkt, at which hundreds of traders sell cattle and horses. In 2010 it was inscribed on the UNESCO Representative List of the Intangible Cultural Heritage of Humanity.

Places of interest

References

External links

Official website - Only available in Dutch
Webpage at Reocities

 
Municipalities of East Flanders
Populated places in East Flanders